Larc Fletcher Spies  is an American actor who is best known for playing Derrick Blank, half-brother to main character Jerri Blank, on the comedy TV series Strangers with Candy (but the role was played in the movie by Joseph Cross).

Career
Larc Spies begin his acting career in 1994, he got his first acing credit as Ned Richmond in the Nickelodeon television series The Adventures of Pete & Pete. His other live action acting credits include Stel in Star Trek: Enterprise, Henry in The Definite Maybe and Kenneth in Cry Baby Lane.

Spies is also a voice actor in animation and video games, with roles in Welcome to Eltingville, What's New, Scooby-Doo?, Jade Empire and Lost Planet 2. He provided the voice of the custom skater in Tony Hawk's Underground, and the English dub voice of Null in Metal Gear Solid: Portable Ops.

Filmography

Film

Television

Video games

References

External links
 

Living people
American male television actors
People from Los Angeles
American male voice actors
1986 births